Twelve Inch Club is the second of four Japan-exclusive EPs by A-ha. Like the other three EPs, it is quite rare due to being only released in Japan. It reached #21 on the Japanese albums chart. Some (if not all) of the first pressing have the title spelt incorrectly on the disc as "Twelve Ihch Club". Tracks 1-3 were included on the 2010 deluxe edition of the album Hunting High and Low (track 1 as (U.S. Mix) and track 3 as a download-only bonus track) and all tracks were included on the 2015 expanded edition of the album Hunting High and Low.

Track listing
 "Train of Thought" (Steve Thompson Mix) – 7:03
 "And You Tell Me" (demo version) – 1:55
 "The Sun Always Shines on T.V." (Steve Thompson Mix) – 8:25
 "Train of Thought" (dub version) – 8:35

References

 	   

A-ha albums
1985 EPs
1985 remix albums
Warner Records remix albums
Warner Records EPs
Remix EPs